Caresanablot is a comune (municipality) in the Province of Vercelli in the Italian region Piedmont, located about  northeast of Turin and about  northwest of Vercelli.

Caresanablot borders the following municipalities: Olcenengo, Oldenico, Quinto Vercellese, Vercelli, and Villata.

References

Cities and towns in Piedmont